Muay Thai in the 27th Southeast Asian Games took place at Wunna Theikdi Boxing Indoor Stadium in Naypyidaw, Myanmar between December 12–21.

Medalists

Men

Women

Medal table

References

2013 Southeast Asian Games events
2013